The massacre in Szczurowa was the murder of 93 Romani people, including children, women and the elderly, by German Nazi occupiers in the Polish village of Szczurowa on 3 August 1943. Between ten and twenty families of settled Romani had lived in Szczurowa for generations, alongside ethnic Poles with whom they had friendly and neighborly relations. They were integrated enough into the general community that there were several mixed marriages.

The massacre

On 3 August 1943 German police rounded up almost all the Romani inhabitants of the village and transported them to the local cemetery where they were shot. A list of all the victims has been preserved in the documents of the local church.

Commemoration

On 8 May 1956, local inhabitants of the village and members of local veterans' associations erected a memorial stone with a suitable inscription at the site of the mass grave of the victims. This became the first memorial commemorating victims of the Romani Holocaust in the world. The memorial is cared for by local schoolchildren and the memory of the tragedy is part of the local historical consciousness. The memorial refers to the victims as "locals" rather than Romani, which may reflect the integration of the Romanies into the larger community. The decision to omit reference to the Romani people on the memorial may also be a result of political narrative shaping by the Polish government of the time.

Since 1960, Romanies from Tarnów have been coming to the region to honor the memory of the victims. Since 1996 the International Romani Caravan of Memory travels around the Tarnów region to commemorate the Nazi mass murder of Romanies during World War II. The main stop of the caravan is Szczurowa where after a visit to the mass grave, a mass is held at the local church.

The Tarnów region was the site of other Nazi crimes against Romanies in addition to that at Szczurowa. Most of the victim's identities and their place of burial are unknown. Other mass graves of murdered Romanies in the region include those at Bielcza (28 murdered), Borzęcin Dolny (28 murdered) and Żabno (49 murdered).

The Romani people, who lived in Europe from the 15th century, were among the groups singled out by the Nazi Germany regime for persecution and were often murdered along with the Jews. Between 500,000 and 1,500,000 Romanies were killed by the Nazis throughout Europe during the Holocaust.

See also
Romani Holocaust
List of massacres in Poland

References

External links
 Bartosz, Adam, "The Gypsy Caravan of Memory Roma National Identity" 
 Kraków Post, "Eighth International Roma Caravan of Memory" 
 Oficjalny Portal Gminy Borzecin (Polish) 
 Yad Vashem Resource Center 

Antiziganism in Europe
Massacres in Poland
Nazi war crimes in Poland
1943 crimes in Poland
Massacres in 1943
World War II massacres
General Government
August 1943 events
Ethnic cleansing in Europe
Romani genocide
Massacres committed by Nazi Germany
Brzesko County